Epicrates alvarezi, the Argentinian rainbow boa, is a species of snake in the family Boidae. The species is found in Argentina, Bolivia, and Paraguay.

References 

Epicrates
Reptiles of Argentina
Reptiles of Bolivia
Reptiles of Paraguay
Reptiles described in 1964